
Year 882 (DCCCLXXXII) was a common year starting on Monday (link will display the full calendar) of the Julian calendar.

Events 
 By place 
 Europe 
 January 20 – King Louis the Younger dies in Frankfurt. He leaves his territory to his younger brother, Emperor Charles the Fat, who becomes sole ruler of the East Frankish Kingdom.
 April 11 – Battle of Remich: A Frankish army under Bishop Wala of Metz is defeated by Vikings, who are on a raid, near Remich (modern Luxembourg). During the fighting Wala is killed. 
 Siege of Asselt: Charles the Fat besieges a Viking camp, who have plundered along the Meuse, the Rhine and the Moselle. He defeats their leader Godfrid, and grants him West Frisia.
 August 5 – King Carloman II becomes sole ruler of the West Frankish Kingdom, after the accidental death of his brother, Louis III. His power is limited by rebellious nobles in Burgundy. 
 Oleg of Novgorod takes Kiev, and makes it his capital, forming the Kievan Rus', replacing the 19-year-long Christianization of the Rus' Khaganate.

 Britain 
 King Alfred the Great increases the size of his new navy, and sails out to attack four Viking ships. Two of the ships are captured (before they surrender), and the other crews are killed.

 Arabian Empire 
 December – Ishaq ibn Kundaj, a Turkic military leader, arrests the Abbasid caliph Al-Mu'tamid, when the latter (and his followers) try to flee into Tulunid territory.

 By topic 
 Religion 
 December 16 – Pope John VIII is assassinated at Rome after a 10-year reign, probably the victim of a political conspiracy. He is succeeded by Marinus I, as the 108th pope of the Catholic Church.

Births 
 February 8 – Muhammad ibn Tughj al-Ikhshid, founder of the Ikhshidid Dynasty (d. 946)
 Abu 'l-Asakir Jaysh ibn Khumarawayh, Muslim emir (approximate date)
 Cao Zhongda, official and chancellor of Wuyue (d. 943)
 Feng Dao, Chinese prince and chancellor (d. 954)
 Han Yanhui, Chinese Khitan chancellor (d. 959)
 Saadia Gaon, Jewish philosopher and exegete (or 892)
 Xia Luqi, general of the Later Tang Dynasty (d. 930)

Deaths 
 January 20 – Louis the Younger, king of the East Frankish Kingdom
 August 5 – Louis III, king of the West Frankish Kingdom
 December 16 – John VIII, pope of the Catholic Church
 December 21 – Hincmar, archbishop of Reims (b. 806)
 Ainbíth mac Áedo, Dál Fiatach king of Ulaid (Ireland)
 Al-Hasan ibn Makhlad al-Jarrah, Muslim vizier
 Ansgarde of Burgundy, Frankish queen (or 880)
 Chen Tao, Chinese poet (b. 824)
 Eric Anundsson, Swedish king (approximate date)
 Eudokia Ingerina, Byzantine empress (approximate date)
 Duan Yanmo, Chinese warlord (approximate date)
 García Íñiguez I, king of Pamplona (approximate date)
 Guaram Mampali, Georgian Bagratid prince
 Lambert III, Frankish nobleman (b. 830)

References